The following ships of the Indian Navy have been named INS Vinash:

Indian Navy ship names